This is a list of visitors to the Salyut space stations in alphabetical order. The names of stations to the right of crew members indicate which stations they visited. If they were a member of an Expedition crew aboard that station, the station name is in bold, and if they commanded the station, the station name is in italics. All cosmonauts were citizens of the Soviet Union unless otherwise noted.

Statistics 
Between 1971 and 1986, 48 individuals of eleven different nationalities visited the Salyut space stations. Vladimir Dzhanibekov made the most visits to Salyut stations, with two trips to Salyut 6 and three to Salyut 7. Georgi Grechko was the only cosmonaut to visit three different Salyut stations; Salyut 4, Salyut 6 and Salyut 7. Svetlana Savitskaya, who made two flights to Salyut 7, was the only woman to fly as part of the programme.

By nationality

By organisation

A
 Vladimir Aksyonov (Salyut 6)
 Aleksandr Aleksandrov (Salyut 7)
 Yuri Artyukhin (Salyut 3)
 Oleg Atkov (Salyut 7)

B
 Anatoli Berezovoy (Salyut 7)
 Valery Bykovsky (Salyut 6)

C
 Jean-Loup Chrétien  (Salyut 7)

D
 Georgi Dobrovolski (Salyut 1)
 Vladimir Dzhanibekov (Salyut 6, Salyut 6, Salyut 7, Salyut 7, Salyut 7)

E

F
 Bertalan Farkas  (Salyut 6)

G
 Yuri Glazkov (Salyut 5)
 Viktor Gorbatko (Salyut 5, Salyut 6)
 Georgi Grechko (Salyut 4, Salyut 6, Salyut 7)
 Aleksei Gubarev (Salyut 4, Salyut 6)
 Jügderdemidiin Gürragchaa  (Salyut 6)

H
 Mirosław Hermaszewski  (Salyut 6)

I
 Aleksandr Ivanchenkov (Salyut 6, Salyut 7)

J
 Sigmund Jähn  (Salyut 6)

K

 Leonid Kizim (Salyut 6, Salyut 7, Salyut 7)
 Pyotr Klimuk (Salyut 4, Salyut 6)
 Vladimir Kovalyonok (Salyut 6, Salyut 6)
 Valery Kubasov (Salyut 6)

L
 Valentin Lebedev (Salyut 7)
 Vladimir Lyakhov (Salyut 6, Salyut 7)

M
 Oleg Makarov (Salyut 6, Salyut 6)
 Yury Malyshev (Salyut 6, Salyut 7)
 Arnaldo Tamayo Méndez  (Salyut 6)

N

O

P
 Viktor Patsayev (Salyut 1)
 Phạm Tuân  (Salyut 6)
 Leonid Popov (Salyut 6, Salyut 6, Salyut 7)
 Pavel Popovich (Salyut 3)
 Dumitru Prunariu  (Salyut 6)

Q

R
 Vladimír Remek  (Salyut 6)
 Yuri Romanenko (Salyut 6, Salyut 6)
 Valery Ryumin (Salyut 6, Salyut 6)

S
 Viktor Savinykh (Salyut 6, Salyut 7)
 Svetlana Savitskaya  (Salyut 7, Salyut 7)
 Aleksandr Serebrov (Salyut 7)
 Vitali Sevastyanov (Salyut 4)
 Rakesh Sharma  (Salyut 7)
 Vladimir Solovyov (Salyut 7, Salyut 7)
 Gennady Strekalov (Salyut 6, Salyut 7)

T

U

V
 Vladimir Vasyutin (Salyut 7)
 Igor Volk (Salyut 7)
 Aleksandr Volkov (Salyut 7)
 Vladislav Volkov (Salyut 1)
 Boris Volynov (Salyut 5)

W

Y

Z
 Vitali Zholobov (Salyut 5)

See also

References 

Astronauts by space program
Salyut visitors
Salyut visitors
Salyut program